Odontopera insulata is a moth of the family Geometridae first described by Max Bastelberger in 1909. It is found in Taiwan.

The wingspan is about 38 mm.

Subspecies
Odontopera insulata insulata
Odontopera insulata tsekua (Wehrli, 1931)

References

Moths described in 1909
Ennominae